Dilo Doxan (born 1 January 1984) is a Kurdish musician from Syria.
 
Doxan was born in the neighbourhood of Tirbesipîyê in the city of Qamisli and completed his education there. Since Doxan grew up in a Kurdish musician family and was raised with traditional Kurdish music, he also decided to become a musician. At the beginning of the 1990s he started his career with percussion instruments. After learning keyboard and Saz, he started singing. In early 1995, he participated in a music festival for young musicians from Syria and won the first prize. In 2004 he released his first album entitled "Rebene". He then gave several concerts and worked on his second album, which he released in 2008 under the title "Dildaro".
 
In March 2009 he fled to Germany for political reasons. Doxan returned to the studio in 2013 and released the album "Hestên dûrîyê" after one year of work in 2014.
 
After producing three albums, Doxan worked with various composers such as Ronî Doxan and Elendê Ûsiv, who had composed one of his most famous songs "Bo çi" for him, and published them on the market.
 
Doxan currently lives in Hanover and performs at concerts all over Europe and is one of the most famous Kurdish singers from Syria.

References 

21st-century Syrian male singers
Syrian refugees
Kurdish-language singers
Kurdish musicians
1984 births
Living people
Syrian emigrants to Germany